Ian Stephens or Ian Stevens may refer to:

 Ian Stephens (artist) (active since 1971), Australian artist
 Ian Stephens (editor) (1903–1984), editor of The Statesman, Kolkata, India
 Ian Stevens (footballer) (born 1966), English former footballer
 Ian Stephens (poet) (1955–1996), Canadian poet, journalist and musician
 Ian Stevens (rugby league), 1990s Wales rugby league footballer
 Ian Stephens (rugby union) (born 1952), former Wales international rugby union player
 Ian Stevens (rugby union) (born 1948), New Zealand rugby union footballer